The 2001 North Carolina Tar Heels men's soccer team represented University of North Carolina at Chapel Hill in the 2001 NCAA Division I men's soccer season. The team was coached by Elmar Bolowich, who was in his thirteenth season with North Carolina. The Tar Heels played their home games at Fetzer Field in Chapel Hill, North Carolina and competed in the Atlantic Coast Conference.

The 2001 season saw the Tar Heels win their first national championship, defeating Indiana in the final.

Roster

Schedule 

|-
!colspan=8 style=""| Exhibition

|-
!colspan=8 style=""| Regular season
|-

|-
!colspan=7 style=""| ACC Tournament
|-

|-
!colspan=7 style=""| NCAA Tournament
|-

|-

Awards and honors

Postseason

2002 MLS SuperDraft 

The following players were selected in the 2002 MLS SuperDraft.

References

External links 
 2001 Roster
 2001 Schedule
 2001 Statistics

2001
2001 Atlantic Coast Conference men's soccer season
2001 in sports in North Carolina
2001
2001
2001 NCAA Division I Men's Soccer Tournament participants